KDCE (950 AM) is a radio station  broadcasting a Spanish Contemporary format.  Licensed to Espanola, New Mexico, United States, the station serves the Santa Fe area.  The station is currently owned by Richard L. Garcia Broadcasting, Inc. and features programming from CNN Radio.

FM Translators

History
KDCE was previously owned by former Governor of New Mexico, John Burroughs. Burroughs sold the station to former Santa Fe Mayor George Abrán Gonzales, who owned and operated the station for fifteen years.

References

External links
FCC History Cards for KDCE

DCE
Radio stations established in 1959
1959 establishments in New Mexico
DCE